The 2009 Togolese Championnat National is the forty-eighth season of the Togolese Championnat National since its establishment in 1961. A total of 16 teams are contesting the league.

Participating teams

League table

References

External links
Rsssf.com

Football competitions in Togo
Togolese Championnat National, 2009
Togo
Togo